Nikos Voutsis (born 4 March 1951) is a Greek politician and MP who served as the Minister of the Interior and Administrative Reconstruction from January 2015 to August 2015, and as President of the Hellenic Parliament from October 2015 to July 2019.

Early life and education

Voutsis was born in Athens. He graduated from the University of Athens and the National Technical University of Athens with a degree in civil engineering.

Political career

Voutsis served as a regional councillor in Attica with the group "Attiki Cooperation –No to the Memorandum" from 2010 to 2012.

Voutsis was first elected as a Member of the Hellenic Parliament representing Athens A in the May 2012 legislative election, and was reelected in June 2012 and January 2015.

Re-elected in the September 2015 elections, on 4 October 2015 he was elected as the new Speaker of the Hellenic Parliament with 181 votes.

After SYRIZA's defeat in the 2019 Greek legislative election, Voutsis' term as Parliament Speaker expired, and he was replaced by Kostas Tasoulas 18 July 2019. Nevertheless, Voutsis was still elected as an MP for SYRIZA.

References

External links
 

1951 births
Greek MPs 2012 (May)
Greek MPs 2012–2014
Greek MPs 2015 (February–August)
Living people
Ministers of the Interior of Greece
National Technical University of Athens alumni
Politicians from Athens
Syriza politicians
Greek MPs 2015–2019
Speakers of the Hellenic Parliament
Greek MPs 2019–2023